John Ogar Odey (November 1, 1959 – 7 October 2018) was appointed Nigerian minister of information and communications in July 2007, and became minister for environment in December 2008 after President Umaru Yar'Adua reshuffled his cabinet.

Biography 
Odey graduated with a B.Sc. in banking and finance from the University of Calabar in 1986.
He has been active within the media, with positions such as general manager for South-South Communication and chairman of News Agency of Nigeria.
He was appointed National Publicity Secretary of the People's Democratic Party (PDP) in 2004.

He served as minister of information and communications and then as minister for the environment in the cabinet of Umaru Yar'Adua. In March 2010, he handed over to the permanent secretary for the ministry of environment after Vice President Goodluck Jonathan dissolved his cabinet.

Death
Odey died on Sunday, October 7, 2018 in Dubai, United Arab Emirates, UAE, after a cancer-related illness that made him travel out of the country for medication.

Burial
 
Odey’s remains were taken home on Tuesday November 6, 2018, for eternal rest in his hometown, Okpoma, Yala Local Government Area of Cross River State amid tears and testimonies. The body arrived at about 5pm, and was taken to the Christ the King Catholic Church in Okpoma for Mass in his honour. He was buried in Okpoma on Wednesday November 7, 2018.

References

1959 births
2018 deaths
Information and communications ministers of Nigeria
National Working Committee people
Federal ministers of Nigeria
University of Calabar alumni
Deaths from cancer in Nigeria